Tonček Štern (born 14 November 1995) is a Slovenian volleyball player who plays for the Greek club Olympiacos and the Slovenian national team. With Slovenia, he was the runner-up of the European Volleyball Championship in 2019 and 2021.

Personal life
Štern has an older brother, Žiga, who is also a volleyball player.

Honours
Olympiacos Piraeus
CEV Challenge Cup: 2022–23

Calcit Kamnik
Slovenian Championship runner-up: 2014–15, 2015–16

Individual
U20 Volleyball European Championship Best Spiker: 2014

References

External links

 
 Player profile at LegaVolley.it  
 Player profile at Volleybox.net 

1995 births
Living people
Sportspeople from Maribor
Slovenian men's volleyball players
Slovenian expatriate sportspeople in Italy
Expatriate volleyball players in Italy
Slovenian expatriate sportspeople in Qatar
Expatriate volleyball players in Qatar
Slovenian expatriate sportspeople in Poland
Expatriate volleyball players in Poland
Slovenian expatriate sportspeople in Turkey
Expatriate volleyball players in Turkey
Slovenian expatriate sportspeople in Greece
Expatriate volleyball players in Greece
Blu Volley Verona players
BKS Visła Bydgoszcz players
Halkbank volleyball players
Olympiacos S.C. players
Opposite hitters